Ionuț Constantin Rada (born 16 March 1990 in Târgu Jiu) is a Romanian footballer who plays as a defender.

Honours

Club
Pandurii
Liga I: runner-up 2013

References

External links
Profile at official club website 
Profile UEFA.com

 

Sportspeople from Târgu Jiu
1990 births
Living people
Romanian footballers
Association football defenders
Romania under-21 international footballers
CS Pandurii Târgu Jiu players
FC Universitatea Cluj players
Liga I players
Liga II players